General Rhodes may refer to:

Charles Dudley Rhodes (1865–1948), U.S. Army major general
Elisha Hunt Rhodes (1842–1917), Rhode Island Militia brigadier general
Godfrey D. Rhodes (1886–1971), British Army brigadier general
Rufus N. Rhodes (1856–1910), Alabama National Guard brigadier general

See also
Robert E. Rodes (1829–1864), Confederate States Army major general